is a former Japanese football player.

Playing career
Sato was born in Saitama Prefecture on August 23, 1977. After graduating from high school, he joined his local club Urawa Reds in 1996. Although he debuted in 1997 season, he could hardly play in the match. In 1999, he moved to newly was promoted to J2 League club, Omiya Ardija. Although he played many matches in 1999, his opportunity to play decreased in 2000. In 2001, he moved to Montedio Yamagata. However he could not play many matches and retired end of 2001 season.

Club statistics

References

External links

1977 births
Living people
Japanese footballers
Association football people from Saitama Prefecture
J1 League players
J2 League players
Urawa Red Diamonds players
Omiya Ardija players
Montedio Yamagata players
Association football forwards